Isaac Boye Edegware (born 5 January 1997) is a Nigerian footballer who plays as a forward for Swedish club IF Karlstad Fotboll on loan from Örebro SK.

Career statistics

Club

References

1997 births
Living people
Nigerian footballers
Nigerian expatriate footballers
Association football forwards
Allsvenskan players
Ettan Fotboll players
Superettan players
Örebro SK players
Umeå FC players
Ljungskile SK players
Nigerian expatriate sportspeople in Sweden
Expatriate footballers in Sweden
IF Karlstad Fotboll players